Piotr Kędzia (born 6 June 1984 in Zgierz) is a Polish former sprinter who specialised in the 400 metres. He represented his country in the 4 × 400 metres relay at the 2008 Summer Olympics finishing sixth in the final.

Competition record

References

External links

1984 births
Living people
People from Zgierz
Sportspeople from Łódź Voivodeship
Polish male sprinters
Olympic athletes of Poland
Athletes (track and field) at the 2008 Summer Olympics
European Athletics Championships medalists
Universiade medalists in athletics (track and field)
Universiade gold medalists for Poland
Universiade silver medalists for Poland
World Athletics Indoor Championships medalists
Medalists at the 2005 Summer Universiade
Medalists at the 2007 Summer Universiade
Medalists at the 2009 Summer Universiade
21st-century Polish people